Chen Mingshu (15 October 1889 – 15 May 1965) was a Chinese general and politician. A Hakka from Hepu, Guangxi, he graduated from Baoding Military Academy and participated in the Northern Expedition. He was briefly premier after Chiang Kai-shek stepped down in December 1931. He took part in the Battle of Shanghai (1932), defending the city against the Japanese Empire.

He was a member of Social Democratic Party of China.

He was one of the principal leaders of the Fujian Rebellion and the Productive People's Party (General Secretary), the failure of which forced him into exile in Hong Kong. In 1948, he joined the Revolutionary Committee of the Kuomintang's central standing committee. After the People's Republic of China was founded, he sat on the standing committees of the Chinese People's Political Consultative Conference and the National People's Congress. During  the Anti-Rightist Movement, he was determined to be a "rightist".

References

External links

 http://rulers.org/indexc2.html#chenm

Premiers of the Republic of China
National Revolutionary Army generals from Guangxi
Delegates to the 1st National People's Congress
1889 births
1965 deaths
People from Beihai
Chinese politicians of Hakka descent
Hakka generals
Republic of China politicians from Guangxi
Members of the Kuomintang
People's Republic of China politicians from Guangxi
Transportation Ministers of the Republic of China
Victims of the Anti-Rightist Campaign
Baoding Military Academy alumni